Lelystad Zuid is a railway station in the south of Lelystad, Flevoland, Netherlands. While constructed, the station is not planned to open before 2025.

The station is located in a currently unbuilt area of Lelystad. In 1988, this area was planned to be developed heavily for residential purposes, but demand for houses in Lelystad was not as big as previously thought and the planned neighbourhood of Warande was never built. 

However, towards the end of 2008, construction at Warande started again and it was initially hoped that the construction will be completed between 2015 and 2020. In February 2011, Nederlandse Spoorwegen said it does not expect to use the station before 2025.

References

Railway stations on the Flevolijn
Railway stations in Flevoland
Proposed railway stations in the Netherlands
Buildings and structures in Lelystad